John II, Count of Nassau-Beilstein (died 1513) was a son of Count Henry IV and his wife, Eva of Sayn. His father was son of John I which in turn was son of Henry II, Count of Nassau-Beilstein.

John II married, in 1492, with Maria of Solms-Braunfels (1471–1505). They had the following children:
 John III (1490–1561)
 Henry V (d. 1525)
 Hermanna (d. 1584)
 Eva (d. 1575)

In 1499, he succeeded his father as the ruling Count of Nassau-Beilstein.

House of Nassau
Counts of Nassau
15th-century births
Year of birth unknown
1513 deaths
15th-century German people
Place of birth missing